was a Japanese long-distance runner. He competed in the men's 5000 metres at the 1932 Summer Olympics.

References

1909 births
1995 deaths
Place of birth missing
Japanese male long-distance runners
Olympic male long-distance runners
Olympic athletes of Japan
Athletes (track and field) at the 1932 Summer Olympics
Japan Championships in Athletics winners
20th-century Japanese people